Drissensky Uyezd (Дриссенский уезд) was one of the eleven subdivisions of the Vitebsk Governorate of the Russian Empire. It was situated in the central part of the governorate. Its administrative centre was Drysa (Drissa).

Demographics
At the time of the Russian Empire Census of 1897, Drissensky Uyezd had a population of 97,083. Of these, 86.2% spoke Belarusian, 9.1% Yiddish, 2.4% Polish, 1.6% Russian, 0.4% Latvian and 0.3% German as their native language.

References

 
Uezds of Vitebsk Governorate